The Michigan Virtual High School is a program funded by the Michigan legislature in July, 2000. It is run by the Michigan Virtual University, in the US State of Michigan.

Criticism
The layout of Michigan Virtual High School has often been called confusing by students.

See also
 e-learning

External links
 MVHS home page

Public high schools in Michigan
American educational websites
Educational institutions established in 2000
2000 establishments in Michigan